MFC Shakhtar Donetsk was a futsal team from Donetsk, Ukraine.

The team was founded in 1998 as Ukrsplav, and after a year came up from the second league to the first one. The team was dissolved in January 2011.

Shakhtar are the most successful in Ukrainian futsal history, having won 5 championships.

Honours

Domestic
Ukrainian Championship
 Winners (5):  2002, 2004, 2005, 2006, 2008
 Runner-Up (3): 2003, 2009, 2010
 Third place (1): 2007
Ukrainian Cup
 Winners (3): 2003, 2004, 2006
 Runner-Up (3): 2001, 2005, 2009
Ukrainian Super Cup
 Winners (3):  2005, 2006, 2008

Other achievements
 Semi-finalist of the 2005–06 UEFA Futsal Cup

References

External links
  Official web site of the team

Shakhtar Donetsk
Defunct futsal clubs in Ukraine
1998 establishments in Ukraine
2011 disestablishments in Ukraine
Mining sports teams